Google Cloud Platform offers numerous integrated cloud-computing services, including compute, network, and storage.

Products 

Past and present products under the Google Cloud platform include:

Current 
 Google Cloud Datastore, a NoSQL database service
 Google Cloud Storage, AKA Google Storage, a file-storage Web service

Discontinued 
 Google Cloud Connect, a former plug-in to synchronize Microsoft Office documents to Google Docs
 Google Cloud Messaging, a former mobile notification service
 Google Cloud Print, a service that lets users print from any device within a network cloud

See also
 Google Docs Editors
 Google Drive
 Google Workspace, a suite of productivity tools offered by Google
 IBM/Google Cloud Computing University Initiative